Fashtal (also Romanized as Fashtāl; also known as Fishtal) is a village in Khara Rud Rural District, in the Central District of Siahkal County, Gilan Province, Iran. At the 2006 census, its population was 906, in 250 families.

References 

Populated places in Siahkal County